This is a list of the titles related to Datuk, or its variant spelling Dato, Dato' or Datu, used in Brunei and Malaysia as titles which are conferred together with certain orders. It may exist in itself as a single-word title, or as the prefix in a string of title such as "Dato Paduka" and "Datuk Seri Panglima". A female recipient on her own right generally receives the title whereby the word "Datuk" (or its variant spelling) is replaced with "Datin" instead. The wife of a Datuk holder also receives a title and it is typically "Datin" (regardless of the husband's full title); the husband of a female recipient does not receive any Datuk title.

Usage

Brunei 

In Brunei, only the variant spelling "Dato" (without apostrophe) is used.

Malaysia 

In Malaysia, the variant spellings "Datuk", "Dato'" (with apostrophe), "Dato" (without apostrophe) and "Datu" are used.

as "Datuk" 
"Datuk" is conferred by the Yang di-Pertuan Agong, the federal sovereign of Malaysia, as well as the non-royal state leaders with the exception of Penang.

as "Dato'" 
"Dato'" (with apostrophe) is conferred by the royal state leaders (the Sultans and Yamtuan Besar of Negeri Sembilan) as well as the non-royal state leader (Yang di-Pertua Negeri) of Penang.

as "Dato" 
"Dato" (without apostrophe) is only conferred by the Yang di-Pertua Negeri of Sarawak for certain ranks of the Most Exalted Order of the Star of Sarawak.

as "Datu" 
"Datu" is only conferred by the Yang di-Pertua Negeri of Sarawak for the Order of Meritorious Service to Sarawak.

See also 
 Malay styles and titles

References

External links 
 List of orders and medals of Brunei Darussalam 
 List of orders, decorations and medals of the states and federal territories of Malaysia